Mary Marsh was a charity worker.

Mary Marsh may also refer to:

People
Mae Marsh (Mary Wayne Marsh, 1894–1968), American film actress
Mary Buff (1890–1970), formerly Mary Marsh, children's illustrator
Mary Butcher (baseball) (1927–2018), later Marsh, All-American Girls Professional Baseball League player
Mary A. Marsh (born 1930), United States Air Force general

Characters
Mary Marsh, fictional character in the 1930 film Hook, Line and Sinker
Mary Marsh, fictional character in The West Wing episode "Pilot"

See also
St Mary in the Marsh, village in Kent, England